Werner Steinmetz (born 12 March 1950) is a German gymnast. He competed in eight events at the 1976 Summer Olympics.

References

External links
 

1950 births
Living people
German male artistic gymnasts
Olympic gymnasts of West Germany
Gymnasts at the 1976 Summer Olympics
Sportspeople from Pforzheim